The first Morrison ministry (Liberal–National Coalition) was the 71st ministry of the Government of Australia. It was led by Prime Minister, Scott Morrison. The Morrison ministry succeeded the second Turnbull ministry, which dissolved on 24 August 2018 following the Liberal Party leadership spills.

Morrison and his Treasurer Josh Frydenberg were sworn in on 24 August. The full ministry was announced on 26 August and sworn in on 28 August 2018. Following Morrison's victory in the 2019 federal election, the second Morrison Ministry was formed in 2019.

Arrangement
The only ministerial change in this arrangement was the appointment of Linda Reynolds to the Cabinet as Minister for Defence Industry on 2 March 2019, replacing Steve Ciobo. Reynolds was also appointed Minister for Emergency Management and North Queensland Recovery following the recent North Queensland floods. This was following the announcement by Ciobo and the Minister for Defence Christopher Pyne that they intend to retire at the upcoming federal election.

Cabinet

Outer Ministry

Assistant Ministry

References

Ministries of Elizabeth II
2018 establishments in Australia
2018 in Australian politics
2019 disestablishments in Australia
2019 in Australian politics
Morrison 1
Cabinets established in 2018
Cabinets disestablished in 2019
History of Australia (1945–present)
Liberal Party of Australia
Morrison Government
National Party of Australia
Scott Morrison